The Board of Secondary Education, Telangana (BSET), also known as Telangana Board of Secondary Education, is a Board of education in Telangana, India. It was established on 10 May 2016. It is located at Nampally, Hyderabad.

The board regulates and supervises the system of functioning for the development of education of Secondary Examination for public and private schools under the state Government of Telangana. The board controls and maintains all the necessary secondary education in the state of Telangana. Under this board, various courses are offered to students for different occupations and to prepare the students for university.

Affiliations
The board affiliates all state schools, private schools and colleges in the state of Telangana. It also established and manages the Secondary Board High School.

Examinations
The board conducts final examinations every spring for the Higher Secondary Examination, High School Certificate Examinations and examinations of other courses prescribed by the board for Class 10.

See also
Telangana Board of Intermediate Education
List of schools in Hyderabad, Telangana

References

External links

 Education in Telangana
 State secondary education boards of India
 State agencies of Telangana
2014 establishments in Telangana
Government agencies established in 2014